St. Thomas Ice Arena is a 1,000-seat ice hockey arena in Mendota Heights, Minnesota. Opened in 2003, it is home to the University of St. Thomas Tommies ice hockey programs in addition to the Saint Thomas Academy boys hockey team.

History
St. Thomas had previously used the State Fair Coliseum for their ice hockey program. After nearly 40 years at the venue, and with the women's program beginning in 2001, the university decided to build their own rink. Due to the school being located in Saint Paul they could not build the rink on campus and instead constructed the arena in the nearby suburb of Mendota Heights.

In 2019, the arena served as the site for the National Championship in NCAA Division III women's ice hockey.

In 2023, the University of St. Thomas announced plans for Lee and Penny Anderson Arena, an on-campus hockey arena in Saint Paul. Its teams would continue to play at St. Thomas Ice Arena through the 2024-2025 season.

References

External links
 Official Home Page

College ice hockey venues in the United States
Sports venues completed in 2003
2003 establishments in Minnesota
Indoor ice hockey venues in Minnesota
Buildings and structures in Saint Paul, Minnesota
University of St. Thomas (Minnesota)